Geraldo Magela da Cruz Quintão (born 1 July 1935) is a Brazilian politician. 
Magela also served as the Brazilian Minister of Defence  from 2000 to 2002.

References

Living people
1935 births
Defence ministers of Brazil
Attorneys General of Brazil